Canal+ Now is a Polish-language television station broadcast by ITI Neovision and is one of nine channels available in Poland under the French Canal+ network. The channel was launched on August 15, 2017.

The channel was created from the so-called Sport 38 channel, which broadcast occasionally sporting events, which due to lack of space in the main channels of broadcasters could not be broadcast live on them. Canal+ Now will remain an occasional channel, making it a station similar to Canal+ Weekend.

From 21 November 2017, the channel offer has been enriched with 4K transmissions.

Programming
Canal+ Now primarily shows special events that are also being broadcast at the same time on Canal+ Poland, Canal+ Sport and Canal+ Sport 2. They will include the UEFA Champions League (play-offs and group stages), Europa League, Ekstraklasa, Cavaliada Tour, EHF Champions League and the PGA European Tour.

References

External links
 

Television channels in Poland
Television channels and stations established in 2017
2017 establishments in Poland
Polish-language television stations
Mass media in Warsaw
Sports television in Poland
Canal+ Premium